Statue of Francisco I. Madero may refer to:

 Equestrian statue of Francisco I. Madero, Mexico City, Mexico
 Statue of Francisco I. Madero (Guadalajara), Jalisco, Mexico